Sierra de San Just is a mountain range in the Cuencas Mineras comarca of Aragon, Teruel Province, Spain. The highest point in the range is San Just (1,522 m). This range is located in one of the coldest and most rugged regions of Aragon.

Geography
Landslides are relatively frequent in the San Just mountains.

Besides the mountain ranges, the Plains of Visiedo near Visiedo, the Altos del Zancado, and the area surrounding Ejulve, are all part of the Sierra de San Just geographic zone.

Road N-211 crosses the range at Gargallo and skirts the mountainsides of the chain.

Mining
There are lignite deposits in the Sierra de San Just range. The Utrillas mines were exploited since ancient Roman times.

See also
List of mountains in Aragon
Cuencas Mineras

References

External links

Geografia de la Provincia de Teruel
 Region of Cuencas Mineras
Paragliding - Sierra de San Just
Utrillas - Historia
Gargallo, en la Sierra de Sant Just
Cuencas Mineras  - Tourism 

San Just
San Just